Lakhimpur Kendriya Mahavidyalaya,  established in 1992, is a general degree college situated at Lakhimpur, Assam. This college is affiliated with the Dibrugarh University.

Departments

Science
Mathematics
Computer Science

Arts
 Assamese
 English
History
Economics
Education
Philosophy
Political Science
Geography
Sociology
Anthropology

References

External links
https://lkmahavidyalaya.edu.in/

Universities and colleges in Assam
Colleges affiliated to Dibrugarh University
Educational institutions established in 1992
1992 establishments in Assam